The Chambly Basin is a shallow, oblong body of water formed by an enlargement of the Richelieu River, extending out from the foot of the rapids on the river between Chambly and Richelieu, in the Quebec region of Montérégie. The towns of Chambly, Richelieu, Saint-Mathias-sur-Richelieu and Carignan surround the basin.

The Chambly Basin is an important area for recreational tourism activities including boating in the summer, the connected Chambly Canal and nearby Fort Chambly National Historic Sites. Its surface is generally frozen from mid-December to the end of March. The water level of the river varies with the seasons and the precipitation.

Geography 
The shape of the basin is similar to the shape of a football. These rapids end at the height of an archipelago of small islands bordering the south-eastern shore of the basin.

The Rivière des Hurons flows toward the middle of the eastern shore of the basin. The Chambly Canal pours its waters on the south shore of the basin, in the area of the Chambly Canal National Historic Site of Canada.

The western part of the basin includes Île aux Lièvres, Demers Island (residential area), Île au Foin and Goyer Island (residential area). Channels separate these islands. These islands are part of the territory of the city of Carignan.

History 
Samuel de Champlain, the European to explore this body water in 1609, wrote: "The entrance to the sault is a kind of lake, where the water goes down, which contains some three leagues round."

In Jesuit Relations of 1665, we read: "This basin is like a small lake, a league and a half of a turn, six to eight feet deep. "

Name 
Chambly Basin was named after the surrounding seignory of Chambly. It's referred to as a "basin" as it's a shallow lake in which alluvium is deposited. The name  was formalized by the Quebec Commission of Geography in 1968.

Image gallery

Notes and references

See also 

 Rouville Regional County Municipality
 La Vallée-du-Richelieu Regional County Municipality
 Richelieu
 Saint-Mathias-sur-Richelieu
 Carignan
 Chambly
 Richelieu River
 Rivière des Hurons
 Chambly Canal
 Fort Chambly
 Goyer Island
 Île aux Lièvres
 Demers Island
 Seigneurie de Chambly
 List of lakes of Montérégie

Lakes of Montérégie
La Vallée-du-Richelieu Regional County Municipality
Rouville Regional County Municipality